The 2004 English cricket season was the 105th in which the County Championship had been an official competition. England recorded a 4–0 Test series whitewash over the West Indies and a comfortable 3-0 win over New Zealand.  Their one-day form was sporadic, however. In the Natwest Trophy, they failed to make the final, which saw New Zealand defeat the West Indies by 107 runs. In the Natwest Challenge, they beat India 2-1. In domestic cricket, Warwickshire won the County Championship.

Honours
County Championship - Warwickshire
C&G Trophy - Gloucestershire
National League - Glamorgan
Twenty20 Cup - Leicestershire
Minor Counties Championship - Bedfordshire and Devon shared title
MCCA Knockout Trophy - Berkshire
Second XI Championship - Somerset II
Second XI Trophy - Worcestershire II
Wisden Cricketers of the Year - Ashley Giles, Steve Harmison, Robert Key, Andrew Strauss, Marcus Trescothick

Events
After scoring 642 in the first innings of their County Championship against 
Glamorgan at the 
County Ground in September, Essex lose the match by 4 wickets. Essex's total of 642 is the highest total in the first innings of a first-class match by the losing side.

Test series

West Indies tour

New Zealand tour

County Championship

National League

C&G Trophy

Twenty20 Cup

References

External links
 Cricinfo
 CricketArchive – season and tournament itineraries

Annual reviews
 Playfair Cricket Annual 2005
 Wisden Cricketers' Almanack 2005

2004 in English cricket
 2004